Nicholas Goldschmidt,  (December 6, 1908 – February 8, 2004) was a Canadian conductor, administrator, teacher, performer, music festival entrepreneur and artistic director. He was the grand-nephew of famed composer Adalbert von Goldschmidt (1848-1906).

In 1937, Goldschmidt immigrated to the US, where he served as director of opera at the San Francisco Conservatory and Stanford University from 1938 to 1942. He was director of the opera department at Columbia University from 1942 to 1944. He subsequently moved to Toronto, where he served as the first music director of the Royal Conservatory Opera School (University of Toronto Opera Division) from 1946 to 1957. In 1950, Goldschmidt, Arnold Walter and Herman Geiger-Torel helped to found the Royal Conservatory Opera Company, which later became the Canadian Opera Company. From 1949 to 1957, Goldschmidt was the first music director of the CBC Opera.

In 1978, Goldschmidt was made an Officer of the Order of Canada, and was promoted to Companion in 1989. In 1997, Goldschmidt received the Governor General's Performing Arts Award, Canada's highest honour in the performing arts.

Goldschmidt married Shelagh Fraser on 26 June 1948.

References

External links
 Canadian Encyclopedia Biography 
 CBC Digital Archives, "Remembering Nicholas Goldschmidt"

1908 births
2004 deaths
People from Znojmo District
People from the Margraviate of Moravia
Male conductors (music)
Companions of the Order of Canada
Members of the Order of Ontario
Musicians from Toronto
Governor General's Performing Arts Award winners
20th-century Canadian conductors (music)
20th-century Canadian male musicians
Czechoslovak emigrants to the United States
American emigrants to Canada